Bosha is an extinct Omotic language of Ethiopia. Ethnologue lists it as a dialect of the Northern Omotic Kafa language, but notes that it may be a distinct language. Other sources list it as unclassified. The Bosha state, the Kingdom of Garo, was a culturally Gonga enclave within the southern Oromo area.

References 

Languages of Ethiopia
North Omotic languages